Miriwoong, also written Miriuwung and Miriwung, is an Aboriginal Australian language which today has fewer than 20 fluent speakers, most of whom live in or near Kununurra in Western Australia. All of the fluent speakers are elderly and the Miriwoong language is considered to be critically endangered. However, younger generations tend to be familiar with a lot of Miriwoong vocabulary which they use when speaking Kimberley Kriol or Aboriginal English.

Linguo-genetic categorisation 
Miriwoong is categorised by linguists as a Non-Pama-Nyungan language and part of the Jarrakan subgroup.

Sign 
As is common in many Australian language communities, the Miriwoong people have a  signed language that is used in addition to the spoken languages of the community.

Multilingualism 
Despite the endangered status of the Miriwoong language, the Miriwoong community is vibrantly multilingual. Languages spoken include Miriwoong (for a small number of speakers), the Miriwoong signed language, Kimberley Kriol, and English. Two varieties of English are present in the community, Aboriginal English, and Standard Australian English. Many speakers are bi-dialectical in both varieties while many others have a strong preference for Aboriginal English.

Mirima Dawang Woorlab-gerring 
The Mirima Dawang Woorlab-gerring Language and Culture Centre has been tasked with the preservation and revitalisation of the Miriwoong language since the 1970s.

MDWg engages in a wide range of language revitalisation and documentation activities including a language nest, public language classes and on-country training camps. The language nest reaches around 300 children every week, both Indigenous and Non-Indigenous.

A significant part of MDWg's revitalisation efforts is the publication of books in Miriwoong.

Some linguistic features

Phonology

Vowels 
The vowel system of Miriwoong comprises the following four vowel phonemes. Length is not phonemic.

Consonants 
Miriwoong distinguishes 19 consonant phonemes. The consonant inventory of Miriwoong is fairly typical for Indigenous Australian languages, having multiple lateral and nasal consonants, no voicing contrast, and no fricatives.

Orthography 
The largely phonemic orthography of Miriwoong was developed at the Mirima Dawang Woorlab-gerring. Some sounds that do not have a standard character in the Latin script are represented by digraphs. The vowel /u/ is spelled oo in Miriwoong.

MDWg is working with local organisations to conform to the standardised orthography when Miriwoong is written in documents or signage.

See also: Transcription of Australian Aboriginal languages

Grammar 
Some notable features of Miriwoong grammar are as follows:

Nouns

Gender 
Miriwoong nouns have grammatical gender and adjectives and demonstratives agree with the noun. There are two genders, designated masculine and feminine.

Case 
Nouns are not marked for case in Miriwoong, although arguments are cross-referenced on the verb, in most cases using a nominative-accusative pattern.

Verbs 
Verbs in Miriwoong have a compound system of coverbs, which are generally uninflected and carry the main semantic content, and inflecting verbs, which carry the grammatical information. Both coverbs and verbs can stand alone but most verbal expressions comprise both a coverb and an inflecting verb (Newry 2015: 20-21). The inflecting verbs are a closed class and number around 20 while the coverbs are an open class. This type of verb system has been observed in other Australian languages, particularly in languages spoken in the north of Australia.

References

Other sources

Galbat-Newry, G., (September 4, 2016) Miriwoong waniwoogeng! Language is the only way to understand our ancient culture. thegardian: Australian Edition, https://www.theguardian.com/culture/2016/sep/04/miriwoong-waniwoogeng-language-is-the-only-way-to-understand-our-ancient-culture

Kofod, FM, 1976. Simple and Compound Verbs: Conjugation by Auxiliaries in Australian Verbal System: Miriwung. Canberra: Australian Institute for Aboriginal Studies.
Olawsky, Knut, J. (2010) Revitalisation Strategies for Miriwoong In Re-awakening languages: theory and practice in the revitalisation of Australia's indigenous languages. In Hobson, J., Lowe, K., Poetics, S. & Walsh, M. (Eds.) Sydney University Press: Sydney
Olawsky, Knut J., 2010. Going public with language: involving the wider community in language revitalisation. In J. Hobson, K. Lowe, S. Poetsch and M. Walsh (eds.), Re-Awakening Languages: Theory and Practice in the Revitalisation of Australia’s Indigenous Languages. Sydney, Australia: Sydney University Press, pp. 75.
Olawsky, Knut, 2013. The Master-Apprentice language learning program down under: experience and adaptation in an Australian context. Language documentation and conservation, 7

Galbat-Newry, G., (2002) Mirima Dawang Woorlab-gerring Language and Culture Centre. Ngoonjook: A Journal of Australian Indigenous Issues. 21 26-49.

Miriwoong language books 

 
 
 
 
 
 
 
 

Jarrakan languages
Endangered indigenous Australian languages in Western Australia
Kimberley (Western Australia)
Kununurra, Western Australia